Redbone Live is a live album by American band Redbone. The album was recorded live on tour in 1977, while opening for War, Average White Band and Tower of Power.

Track listing
"Don't Say No" (Pat Vegas/Lolly Vegas) - 4:48
"Witch Queen of New Orleans" (P. Vegas/L. Vegas) - 3:41
"Give Our Love Another Try" (P. Vegas/L. Vegas) - 7:29
"Maggie" (L. Vegas) - 9:09
"Come and Get Your Love" (L. Vegas) - 6:11
"Gamble (Take a Chance on Me)" (P. Vegas/L. Vegas) - 4:21
"Far Out Party at Gazzari's" (Instrumental) (P. Vegas/L. Vegas) - 8:23

Personnel
Lolly Vegas - guitar, vocals
Pat Vegas - bass guitar, vocals
Aloisio Aguiar - keyboards
Eddie Summers - drums

Additional personnel
Gabriel Katona - keyboards, vocals
Jack White - drums
Plato T. Jones - percussion

References

Redbone (band) albums
1994 live albums